People's Justice Front or in  (AKAR) was a splinter party of Parti Bersatu Sabah (PBS) formed in 1989 which was led by Dusun  and Bajau ethnic-based leaders namely Mark Koding, Kalakau Untol and Pandikar Amin Mulia. In 1995, AKAR had gone through a leadership crisis between Pandikar Amin Mulia and Jeffrey Kitingan. AKAR BERSATU was dissolved to enable its members to join UMNO in 2001.

General election results

State election results

External links 
  BERAKHIRNYA AKAR BERSATU, ADAKAH JUGA PETANDA BERAKHIRNYA POLITIK IRANUN?

References 

Defunct political parties in Sabah